Zinedine Soualem (born 17 April 1957) is a French actor. He has appeared in at least five films directed by Cédric Klapisch.

Personal life
Soualem is Algerian by ancestry, and was at one point married to the actress Hiam Abbass. They have two daughters, Lina and Mouna.

Theatre

Filmography

References

External links

 

1957 births
Living people
French male film actors
French people of Algerian descent
French male television actors
20th-century French male actors
21st-century French male actors
People from Thiers